The 1991 FIVB Volleyball World League was the second edition of the annual men's international volleyball tournament, played by 10 countries from 17 May to 27 July 1991. The Final Round was held in Milan, Italy.

Pools composition

Intercontinental round

Pool A

|}

|}

Pool B

|}

|}

Final round
Venue:  Forum di Assago, Assago, Italy

Semifinals

|}

3rd place match

|}

Final

|}

Final standing

Awards
 Most Valuable Player
  Andrea Zorzi
 Best Spiker
  Ron Zwerver
 Best Setter
  Shin Young-chul
 Best Blocker
  Martin van der Horst
 Best Server
  Ron Zwerver
 Best Receiver
  Scott Fortune
 Best Digger
  Scott Fortune

External links

1991 World League results 

FIVB Volleyball World League
FIVB World League
Volleyball
1991 in Japanese sport